William Clark (25 February 1932 – 27 July 2006) was a Scottish footballer, who played in the Scottish League for Arbroath and Berwick Rangers and in the English Football League for Queens Park Rangers.

References

1932 births
2006 deaths
Sportspeople from Larkhall
Association football forwards
Scottish footballers
Petershill F.C. players
Arbroath F.C. players
Queens Park Rangers F.C. players
Berwick Rangers F.C. players
Cheltenham Town F.C. players
Scottish Football League players
English Football League players
Scottish Junior Football Association players
Footballers from South Lanarkshire